Mixed Blessings is a Canadian television comedy-drama series, which aired on APTN.

The show was created by Ric Beairsto, Ron E. Scott and Drew Hayden Taylor, from an original concept by Ric Beairsto. The series stars Gary Basaraba and Tina Lameman as Hank Kowalchuk and Josie Fraser, two widowed single parents in Fort McMurray, Alberta who fall in love and are faced with the challenges of successfully blending their families despite their significantly different backgrounds: Kowalchuk is Ukrainian Canadian, while Fraser is Cree.

The show's cast also includes Kirklin Maclise, Jesse Frechette, Emma Duncan, Big Daddy Tazz, Michelle Thrush, Wilma Pelly, Emma Ashbaugh, Allen Belcourt and Griffin Powell Arcand.

Following some criticism that the first season of the show wasn't particularly funny despite it having been marketed as a comedy drama, the second season was not as tightly scripted, and instead featured some opportunities for the actors to incorporate some aspects of improvisational comedy into their dialogue.

References

External links

Mixed Blessings

2007 Canadian television series debuts
Aboriginal Peoples Television Network original programming
Television shows filmed in Edmonton
Television shows set in Alberta
2000s Canadian comedy-drama television series
2008 Canadian television series endings
First Nations television series